Living Britain is a six-part nature documentary series, made by the BBC Natural History Unit, transmitted from October to December 1999. It was narrated by Samuel West and produced by Peter Crawford. It examines British wildlife over the course of one year. Each of the programmes takes place in a different time of year.

Episodes

1. "Deepest Winter" (31 October 1999)
Looks at Britain in the grip of winter featuring Eurasian otters, eagles, waders, swans, squirrels, red foxes, toads and deer.

2. "Spring" (7 November 1999)
Follows the arrival of spring as it moves north featuring barn swallow, newt, eel, polecat, red kite and wildflowers.

3. "Early Summer" (14 November 1999)
Follows the changing seasons with the arrival of early summer featuring may-flies, moles, northern gannets and phalaropes.

4. "High Summer" (21 November 1999)
Midsummer is a busy time for insects, grouse & merlins rear their young & basking sharks visit our shores.

5. "Autumn" (28 November 1999)
Autumn is a dramatic time of change – birds migrate, red deer rut, leaves change colour & fungi abound.

6. "Winter Reflections" (5 December 1999)
Looks at the influence of people on Britain's wildlife in the past & looks ahead to the new millennium.

External links
 
 

BBC television documentaries
1999 British television series debuts
1999 British television series endings
English-language television shows